The PERMATApintar National Gifted Center, UKM, more commonly known as the Malaysian National Gifted Centre, UKM is a gifted center that provides education services for gifted and talented Malaysian students aged 12 – 17 in Malaysia. It was established by University Kebangsaan Malaysia to support the Malaysian Gifted and Talented Program mooted by Datin Seri Rosmah Mansor in 2009. ; wife of the former Prime Minister of Malaysia, Dato' Seri Najib Razak. Universiti Kebangsaan Malaysia under the leadership of then Vice Canselor, Tan Sri Dato Wira Dr. Sharifah Hapsah binti Syed Hasan Shahabudin was appointed as the implementer of the program. Professor Datuk Dr. Noriah Mohd Ishak was then appointed as the first Director of the Malaysian National Gifted Center Pusat PERMATApintar Negara, UKM. Her role was to develop assessment tools to search for the gifted and talented, develop the academic pathways for gifted and talented Malaysian children, develop a comprehensive and challenging curriculum for the gifted and talented Malaysian students and implement the program effectively with the support of UKM, for the benefit of gifted and talented Malaysian students. It is the only programme in Malaysia that identifies academically gifted and talented students. PERMATApintar currently  offers three programmes: the Summer Camp programme (PPCS), the PERMATApintar College programme, and the ASASIpintar programme (UKM Pre-university programme).

Talent Search

The Malaysian Gifted Center used two on-line assessment tools to search for the gifted and talented around Malaysia. The assessment tools are known as UKM1 and UKM2. UKM1 measures both verbal comprehension and inductive-deductive reasoning, while UKM2 measure verbal comprehension, inductive-deductive reason, recall memory and information processing. A total of 2.4 million children have tried the UKM1 assessment tool since 2009 and more than 56,000 have been selected to sit for the UKM2 test. Students who meet the cut-off scores of both tests will then be invited to participate in the School Holiday Program conducted annually at the Gifted Center in December. UKM1 test is open annually from January until end of May. The UKM2 test will open annually from July to September.

School Holiday Camp

The School Holiday Camp is a STEM-based program aimed at instilling interest in STEM among the young gifted and talented students. The camp offered residentially for three weeks offers various STEM-related courses such as Cryptology, Biotechnology, Flight Science, Crime Scene Investigation, Crystal and Polymer, Engineering, Probability and Game Theory, Ethnomathematics, Mathematics for the Universe, Robotics etc. Students offered to the camp can select one of the course for the three weeks duration. Classes will be taught by teachers and assistant teachers who are trained by the management of the Malaysian National Gifted Center. Students will start their academic activities from 8 am until 4 pm, followed by co-curricular activities in the late afternoon. The camp is a good platform for gifted students to interact, learn from each other and practice social ethics. The students will also sit for the UKM3 test during the School Holiday Camp. UKM3 test is used as a screening tool for admission to the PERMATApintar National College, UKM.

PERMATApintar National College, UKM

The PERMATApintar National College, UKM offers middle and high school education to the Malaysian gifted and talented students. It offers five years of education starting from Foundation 1 to 3 for the middle school, and Level 1 and 2 for the high school. The college used a curriculum that combines the National Curriculum, university courses, Advance Placement courses offered by the American College Board, International Languages, research through its Research Mentoring Program, and Personal Development. Students have to complete 127 credits of coursework for the five-year period. The college practices acceleration, compacting of the curriculum and offers various enrichment programs which include; DNA Bar-Coding, Astrophysics, Robotic, United Nation Model, World Scholar Cup, Entomology, and F1 in School. More than 1,000 students have been accepted into the college and 526 have graduated since 2012. These students are now pursuing their undergraduate, Masters or PhD work in universities around the world including the University of Cambridge, University of Oxford, Stanford University, Imperial College, UCLA, University of Michigan etc. They have won many accolades and put Malaysia on the world map of academic excellence. It is worth noting that admission to this college is not limited to criteria like age or family background. As of 2009, all students have gained admission to university locally or abroad.

Asasipintar, UKM

The Asasipintar, UKM program was developed to bridge students from the PERMATApintar College to the university, in particular UKM. The program is also offered to SPM school leavers who scored well in the national examination. It is a fast-track one-year program aimed at preparing the students for campus learning. The program is STEM-based and offers courses like Physic, Chemistry, Biology, Statistics, Calculus, Algebra, Language Appreciation, Research and Self-Development. A small number of students are also offered courses in Economy, Law and Psychology Students have to complete 50 credit hours courses within the one-year stipulated time. Upon completion and depending on their CGPA, students can apply to the faculty of their choices.

In 2019, the PERMATA programme was rebranded and renamed to Genius as it undergo process to enhanced in terms of quality of the child development programme.

History 
PERMATApintar National Gifted Center, UKM is the first gifted school in Malaysia. Established on 3 April 2009, Datin Seri Rosmah Mansor, planned to have a school for Malaysian gifted students after visiting various countries' gifted schools as early as 2006. To realize her plan, a series of discussions with local and foreign experts took place to come up for a suitable program in Malaysia.

The controversy programme was started nearly a decade ago after Najib Razak then took office. However, the previous Barisan Nasional (BN) administration had claimed that Rosmah was not involved in Permata's day-to-day operations. A working paper of PERMATApintar was then approved by the Former Prime Minister of Malaysia, Najib in 2008. The National University of Malaysia was appointed to implement the program with the fund disbursed from the PERMATA Division of the Prime Minister's Department. An agreement was made in Kuala Lumpur in April 2009 with the Johns Hopkins University - Center for Talented Youth to help kick start the program.

In January 2010, National University of Malaysia gave a  land located at Bukit Puteri to the government to build the PERMATApintar complex. Its first and incumbent director is Prof Datuk Dr Noriah Mohd. Ishak. The construction was divided into two phases. The construction of Phase 1 started in early 2010 and finished at the end of 2010 with the allocation of RM23 million. The second phase was constructed right after the completion of the first phase in February 2011 with an allocation of RM54 million. The second phase was finished in December 2011. The first batch of Level 1 students started their study in PERMATApintar National Gifted Center in January 2011.

In 2013, the third phase of the construction started in April 2013 fully funded by the Al-Bukhary Foundation. The construction involved the auditorium and the sports center. The construction was finished in October 2014.

In 2014, PERMATApintar started receiving its first batch of Foundation 1 students, aged 12 and 13 years old, who will study in PERMATApintar for five years.

In 2015, then minister Datuk Seri Shahidan Kassim said as patron of the programme, Rosmah does not handle any administrative, financial or managerial matters, as well as other functions that come under the purview of the civil service.

After Pakatan Harapan (PH) took over the government after the 2018 general election (GE14), Deputy Prime Minister Datuk Seri Dr Wan Azizah Wan Ismail said the new administration would not pull the plug on Permata, but would audit and review the programme. In 2018, PERMATApintar National Gifted Center was transferred to Sektor Pengurusan PERMATA, School Management Division, Ministry of Education from PERMATA Division, Prime Minister's Department.

In 2019, the Education Minister Dr Maszlee Malik announced the PERMATA programme renamed to Genius as it undergo a rebranding process to make the child development programme more competitive and highly motivated.

Campus 
The PERMATApintar National Gifted Center is located in the Bangi campus of the National University of Malaysia, one of the most prestigious public universities in Malaysia. It is situated in the developing town of Bangi which is easily accessible by the North–South Expressway (Malaysia) via the Bangi exit and the KTM Komuter UKM station.

There are 15 buildings and a sports complex on PERMATApintar's  UKM campus, including the academic and residential sectors. The campus is divided into three phase. It is located at Bukit Puteri, UKM, Bangi. Two phases finished in December 2011 whereas the third phase finished in October 2014. The first phase consists of 5 buildings whereas the second phase consists of 5 residential buildings and remaining academic buildings. The auditorium and the sports complex are a part of the expansion project funded by Al-Bukhary Foundation.
Work on Phase 1 started in early 2010 and finished at the end of 2010. In Phase 1, it consists of five buildings: administration block, academic building with eight classrooms, a laboratory block, a multipurpose hall and a cafeteria.

The administration block consisted of three offices, a library, an open hall, a surau, an event room, two meeting rooms and an observatory. The offices are PERMATApintar High School Programme Office, ASASIpintar (UKM Pre-University) Programme Office and Talent Search (Summer Camp Programme) Office.

Right after Phase 1 completed, the construction of Phase 2 started: February 2011. It was completed in December 2011. In Phase two, it consisted of an instructors block, a laboratory block, an academic building, four hostel buildings, a dining hall and a school minimart. All of the Science labs in this block is used for the ASASIpintar Programme. The academic building consisted of 12 classes of which four are for ASASIpintar Programme.

The auditorium and the sports center were contributed by the Al-Bukhary Foundation. The construction of these buildings started in January 2013 and finished in October 2014. The sports complex consisted of an Olympic-sized swimming pool, a football field, eight running tracks and a mini-gym.

Admission 
The college conducts a student selection process every year. Any Malaysian students aged 9 to 15 are allowed to apply. In the selection process, there are three steps which are Ujian (Test) UKM1, Ujian (Test) UKM2, and  Ujian (Test) UKM3 during the School Holiday Camp (PCS). A student must pass Ujian UKM1, Ujian UKM2, successfully attended and completed School Holiday Camp (PCS), and Ujian (Test) UKM3.

Ujian UKM1 is the first selection test for students who wish to join programmes under PERMATApintar. Students who passed the Ujian UKM1 are invited to join the Ujian UKM2 held in UKM2 centres across the country.

Ujian UKM2 is the second selection test to filter and search talented students who can join the School Holiday Camp. Those who pass UKM2 will then be invited to join the School Holiday Camp held in December every year.

School Holiday Camp or PCS is an academic summer camp which offers 23 first year university courses which develop students interests in STEM. PCS is held twice each year, in June and December, until 2016 when the mid-year school holiday clashes with Ramadan, a fasting month for the Muslim majority in Malaysia. The December PCS is held for three weeks whereas the June PCS is held for two weeks. Those who are admitted to June PCS are from the previous year UKM2 participants.

The Ujian UKM3 or the third selection test is also conducted during the camp. Only those who passed UKM3 will then allowed to join the PERMATApintar High School programme. All participants were given a course based on their performance in UKM2. The courses given to the participants vary each year but some notable example of courses are Logical Reasoning, Robotics, Ethnomathematics, Astrophysics and Green Technology.

Syllabus 
PERMATApintar uses Sijil Pelajaran Malaysia (SPM) curriculum as PERMATA's core curriculum with enrichment syllabus from Sijil Tinggi Pelajaran Malaysia (STPM) curriculum and United States' College Board Advanced Placement curriculum. The reason for merging curriculum mentioned above is to develop a curriculum that could challenge minds of Gifted student.

The academics offered in PERMATApintar College is divided into two programs which are Foundation program and High school Diploma program. Foundation Program is offered to Foundation 1, 2 and 3 students whereas the High school Diploma program is offered to Level 1 and 2 students.

The teaching and learning session in PERMATApintar is conducted based on the student-oriented learning system. Students who show extraordinary achievement in academic performance is allowed to join the Accelerated Learning Program which uses Curriculum Acceleration. The mode of teaching and learning is the Malay language for the national curriculum and English language is used if needed.

Activities and events

Future Scientist Conference 
Organized by PERMATApintar National Gifted Center, UKM, this annual conference is an avenue for High School Students to present and share their research experiences. This conference was first held in 2012 at PERMATApintar College,  UKM, in Bangi, Selangor. All schools are invited to participate in this conference. Participants will then paired with professors and lecturers in UKM to help in conducting the research.

Nobelist Mindset Programme 
UKM in collaboration with The New York Academy of Sciences (NYAS) organised the first Nobelist Mindset Workshop which was held at Pusat PERMATApintar Negara, UKM from 27 until 31 January 2013. The programme has entered its fifth year when the programme was held at London in May 2017.

Gallery

References

External links 
 
 

Schools in Selangor